Eremias argus (Korean:표범장지뱀,Chinese:丽斑麻蜥,Russian:Монгольская ящурка), also known commonly as the Mongolia racerunner, is a species of lizard in the family Lacertidae. The species is endemic to Asia. There are two recognized subspecies.

Etymology
The specific name, argus, refers to Argus, the many-eyed giant in Greek mythology, an illusion to the ocelli (eye spots) of this species.

Geographic range
E. argus is found in China, Korea, Mongolia, and Russia.

Habitat
E. argus is found in a wide variety of habitats, including desert, rocky areas, grassland, shrubland, forest, and freshwater wetlands. Similarly, the species has been found at a wide range of altitudes, .

Reproduction
E. argus is oviparous.

Subspecies
Two subspecies are recognized as being valid, including the nominotypical subspecies.
Eremias argus argus 
Eremias argus barbouri

References

Further reading
Peters W (1869). "Eine Mittheilung über neue Gattungen und Arten von Eidechsen ". Monatsberichte der Königlich Preussischen Akademie der Wissenschaften zu Berlin 1869: 57–66 + one unnumbered plate. (Eremias argus, new species, pp. 61–62 + plate, figure 3). (in German).
Schmidt KP (1925). "New Chinese Amphibians and Reptiles". American Museum Novitates (175): 1–3. (Eremias barbouri, new species, p. 2).
Zhao E, Adler K (1993). Herpetology of China. Oxford, Ohio: Society for the Study of Amphibians and Reptiles (SSAR). 522 pp.

Eremias
Reptiles of China
Reptiles of Korea
Reptiles of Mongolia
Reptiles of Russia
Reptiles described in 1869
Taxa named by Wilhelm Peters